Vettaikaranpudur is a panchayat town located in Pollachi taluk of Coimbatore district, Tamil Nadu, located 16 kilometres (9.9 mi) from Pollachi, and nestled among Coconut plantations in the foothills of the Anamalai hills and the Anamalai Tiger Reserve. It is known for Alukku Swami Siddhar Koil,  and has been known for the Rekla races, Goat fights, and  Horse races that take place here. It has also always been a popular location for filming Kollywood movies. 

Vettaikaranpudur is located close to major tourist attractions such as Aliyar Reservoir, Masani Amman Koil, Topslip, and Valparai. It is also becoming a tourist destination in its own right, offering tourists a respite from chaos of India's many bustling cities with its many up-and-coming homestays and resorts. 

Vettaikaranpudur is divided into 18 wards, and elections are held every five years. According to the Population Census of 2011, The total population of Vettaikaranpudur is 17,392, of which 8,553 are men and 8,839 are women.

The local economy has traditionally relied on agriculture, the primary driver being the coconut plantations that surround the area, with interspersed plantings of cocoa, betel nuts, and nutmeg. Sugar cane and rice significant crops to the people of Vettaikaranpudur. The dams which provide water for the village include Parambikulam Dam, Aliyar Reservoir, and Thirumoorthy Dam.

In addition to agriculture, the people of Vettaikaranpudur have a long history of craftsmanship. The village is famous for its traditional silk weaving, wood carving, and other handicrafts. These crafts are passed down from generation to generation and are an important part of the cultural heritage of the village.

Vettaikaranpudur is also known for its religious significance. The village is home to several ancient temples, including the Sri Vettaiyapuram temple, which is dedicated to Lord Vishnu. The temple is considered to be one of the oldest in the region and attracts a large number of devotees from all over the region.

References

Cities and towns in Coimbatore district